Dungannon (named after the town of Dungannon) is the name of a former barony  in present-day County Tyrone, Northern Ireland. In 1613 it was enlarged with its amalgamation with the barony of Mountjoy and the south-west corner of the barony of Loughinsholin. By 1851 it was split into three baronies:
 Dungannon Lower
 Dungannon Middle
 Dungannon Upper

References

County Tyrone
Former baronies of Ireland